The MAK – Museum of Applied Arts (German: Museum für angewandte Kunst) is an arts and crafts museum located at Stubenring 5 in Vienna's 1st district Innere Stadt. Besides its traditional orientation towards arts and crafts and design, the museum especially focuses on architecture and contemporary art.
The museum has been at its current location since 1871. Since 2004 the building is illuminated in the evenings by the permanent outdoor installation "MAKlite" of American artist James Turrell.
In 2015 the MAK became the first museum to use bitcoin to acquire art, when it purchased the screensaver "Event listeners" of van den Dorpel. With over 300.000 objects displayed online, the MAK presents the largest online collection within the Austrian Federal Museums. The audio guide to this museum is provided as a web-based app.

History 
On 7 March 1863, the Imperial Royal Austrian Museum of Art and Industry – today's MAK—was founded by Emperor Franz Joseph I. Rudolf von Eitelberger, the first Professor of art history at the University of Vienna, was appointed director. Following the example of London's South Kensington Museum (today's Victoria and Albert Museum) which was founded in 1852, the museum aims at serving as an exemplary collection for artists, industrialists, and the public and as an institution for education and training of designers and craftspeople. The museum opened on 12 May 1864, at first provisionally in rooms of the Ballhaus building next to the Vienna Hofburg, which were adapted for the purpose of the museum by architect Heinrich von Ferstel.

With the establishment of the k.k. Wiener Kunstgewerbeschule (Vienna School of Arts and Crafts) in 1867, theoretical and practical training was united. At first, the school was housed in the former gun factory at Währinger Straße 11–13/Schwarzspanierstraße 17 (nowadays the Anatomical Institute of the Medical University of Vienna which was newly constructed in 1886). Only after the construction of an extension next to the Imperial Royal Austrian Museum of Art and Industry, did the school move to Stubenring 3 in 1877.

1897, Arthur von Scala, until then director of the Royal Middle Eastern Museum (later Royal Austrian Trade Museum), takes over as director of the Museum of Art and Industry, bringing Otto Wagner, Felician von Myrbach, Koloman Moser, Josef Hoffmann and Alfred Roller on board to work at the museum and at the School of Arts and Crafts. Due to conflicts between Scala and the Arts and Crafts Association (founded in 1884), who sees his influence on the museum beginning to wane, Archduke Rainer resigns 1898 as the museum's protector. New statutes were drawn up. Two years later, around 1900, the museum and the School of Arts and Crafts each received their own separate administration, although their final separation did not take place until 1909: The museum was placed under the aegis of the Ministry of Culture and Education, the school stayed at the Royal Ministry of Cultus and Education. In 1907, the Museum of Art and Industry took over most of the collection of the Royal Austrian Trade Museum.

From 1865 to 1897, the Museum of Art and Industry also published the magazine Mittheilungen des k. k. Österreichischen Museums für Kunst und Industrie (Transactions of the Imperial Royal Austrian Museum of Art and Industry). From 1898 to 1921, however, the Museum Journal was published with the new name Kunst und Kunsthandwerk and soon gained international reputation. The museum began publishing the periodical alte und moderne kunst (old and modern art).

After the establishment of the First Republic, the holdings previously in the possession of the Habsburgs—e.g. oriental carpets—were handed over to the Museum. In 1936 and 1940, the Museum on Stubenring gave part of its sculpture collection to the Kunsthistorisches Museum [Museum of Art History]. In exchange, it received the arts and crafts section of the collections of Albert Figdor and of the Kunsthistorisches Museum. Following Austria's annexation by Nazi Germany, the museum was renamed "Staatliches Kunstgewerbemuseum in Wien" (State Arts and Crafts Museum in Vienna). Between 1939 and 1945, Austria's museums take over several confiscated private collections. The collection of the "State Arts and Crafts Museum" also expanded in this way. Since 1998, numerous works of art have been restituted to their owners as a result of provenance research.

In 1947, the "Staatliches Kunstgewerbemuseum in Wien" (State Arts and Crafts Museum) was renamed "Österreichisches Museum für angewandte Kunst" (Austrian Museum of Applied Arts). In 1949, the museum reopened following the repair of war-related damage. In 1965, the Geymüllerschlössel in Vienna's 18th district was affiliated to the museum and became a new branch. At the same time as the building, the MAK also acquired Dr. Franz Sobek's important clock collection (160 Old-Viennese clocks from the time between 1750 and the second half of the 19th century) as well as furniture from the years 1800 to 1840. In the late 1980s, parts of the wall paintings were returned to their original state in the course of the renovation of the façade. The subsequent rearrangement of the furniture and the extraordinary clock collection in the rooms of the Geymüllerschlössel have provided visitors with an authentic insight into the diversity of Biedermeier interior decorating until today.

The Arenbergpark Flak Tower—one of the six flak towers erected in Vienna during World War II—became an additional branch of the museum in 1994 and since 1995 has served as the MAK Contemporary Art Depot (MAK Tower), which hosts major parts of the Contemporary Art Collection of the museum. Currently, the MAK Tower is closed to the public due to a lack of official approval.

After a MAK exhibition about Josef Hoffmann in 1992 in his house of birth in Brtnice/Pirnitz (Czech Republic), contact with the Moravian Gallery in Brno(Czech Republic) has been intensified. Finally, since 2006 both institutions have managed Hoffmann's birthplace as a joint branch—the Josef Hoffmann Museum. The museum presents its collection in a permanent exhibition and, at the same time, temporary exhibitions about Josef Hoffmann and his contemporaries.

In 1994, the MAK founded the branch MAK Center for Art and Architecture in Los Angeles, USA. The center is located in three important buildings of the Viennese architect Rudolph M. Schindler in Los Angeles (Rudolph Schindler House, Pearl M. Mackey Apartment House, Fitzpatrick-Leland House). The focus is on new trends and interdisciplinary developments in the fields of fine arts and architecture which are expedited through scholarships and projects and are expanded through temporary exhibitions.

One important sphere of influence of the MAK is its presentation in public space. The museum actively supports contemporary artists, whose works are mostly presented in an exhibition in the MAK building and later as works of art in Vienna's urban space in order to mediate at the interface between art and public space. International artists such as James Turrell (MAKlite, Permanent installation on the façade of the MAK since 2004, Stubenring 5, 1010 Vienna), Michael Kienzer (Stylit, 2005, Stubenring/Weiskirchnerstraße, 1010 Vienna), Franz West (4 Larvae (Lemur Heads) 2001, Stubenbrücke, 1010 Vienna), Donald Judd (Stage Set, 1996, Stadtpark, 1030 Vienna) and Philip Johnson (Wiener Trio, 1998, Franz-Josefs-Kai/Schottenring, opposite Ringturm, 1010 Vienna) have been represented.

In 2000, Austria's federal museums were removed from state administration; the museum became a "public-law academic institution."

In 2015, the MAK initiated the Vienna Biennale, the first Biennale to combine art, design and architecture. It lasted from 11 June to 4 October 2015 and was initiated by the MAK in partnership with the University of Applied Arts Vienna, Kunsthalle Wien, the Architekturzentrum Wien, and the Vienna Business Agency, creative center departure, and organized with support from the AIT Austrian Institute of Technology as a non-university research partner. The second Vienna Biennale took place from 21 June to 1 October 2017. The third Vienna Biennale took place from  29 May until 6 October 2019, the fourth from 28 May until 3 October 2021.

Directors 

 Rudolf Eitelberger (1863–1885)
 Jacob von Falke (1885–1895)
 Bruno Bucher (1895–1897)
 Arthur von Scala (1897–1909)
 Eduard Leisching (1909–1925)
 Hermann Trenkwald (1925–1927)k
 August Schestag (1927–1932)
 Richard Ernst (1932–1950)
 Ignaz Schlosser (1950–1958)
 Viktor Griessmaier (1958–1968)
 Wilhelm Mrazek (1968–1978)
 Gerhard Egger (1978–1981)
 Herbert Fux (1981–1984)
 Ludwig Neustifter (Interim. director, 1984–1986)
 Peter Noever (1986–2011)
 Martina Kandeler-Fritsch (Interim. director, Februar to August 2011)
 Christoph Thun-Hohenstein (September 2011 to August 2021)
Lilli Hollein (since September 2021)

In 2016, Christoph Thun-Hohenstein was appointed Director or rather General Director and artistic director of the MAK for another 5 years. At the same time, Teresa Mitterlehner-Marchesani—in the course of the introduction of joint management of the Austrian Federal Museums—was appointed managing director. In 2021 Lilli Hollein was appointed General Director and Artistic Director – she is the first female director in the MAK's history.

Building 

From 1869, a new museum complex for the Imperial Royal Museum of Art and Industry was built at Stubenring 5 in the style of the Neo-Renaissance, according to plans by Heinrich von Ferstel. The painter Ferdinand Laufberger made a frieze in sgraffito and the fresco paintings on the mirror vault of the staircase. On 15 November 1871, the museum opened to the public within a big opening. It was the first museum building on the Vienna Ring Road. Laufberger's cartoons were lost, and so around 1893 the mural painting of the figures on the outer façade were recreated by students of Karl Karger of the School of Applied Arts. In 1875 the Austrian Museum was joined by an adjacent new building for the School of Applied Arts at Stubenring 3, whose plans were also drawn up by Heinrich von Ferstel. It was opened in 1877.

In 1906, Ludwig Baumann designed an extension building for the museum located at Weiskirchnerstraße 3, it was completed in 1908. After World War II repair of war-related damage to the museum building lasted until 1949.

In 1989, a complete renovation of the museum's old buildings and construction of both a two-story underground depot and a connecting wing by with a generous storage facility and additional exhibition space began. After this renovation, the museum opened in 1993. Its showrooms were designed by artists such as Barbara Bloom, Eichinger or Knechtl, Günther Förg, Gangart, Franz Graf, Jenny Holzer, Donald Judd, Peter Noever, Manfred Wakolbinger and Heimo Zobernig. In 2014, a repositioning of the Permanent Collection Carpets with an artistic intervention by Füsun Onur and a repositioning of the Permanent Collection Asia, whose artistic design was entrusted to Tadashi Kawamata in 2014 and 2016, took place.

The building in the Weiskirchnerstraße is reserved for temporary exhibitions, while the rooms at Stubenring host the permanent collections and the MAK DESIGN LAB.

MAK Permanent Collection 
In accordance with its historical justification, the MAK Permanent collection is divided into different sections according to its functional purpose.

 Vienna 1900 Design / Arts and Crafts 1890–1938
 Carpets
 Asia. China – Japan – Korea
 Renaissance Baroque Rococo
 Baroque, Rococo, Classicism
 Empire Style Biedermeier
 Historicism Art Nouveau

Highlights of the collection are the holdings of the Wiener Werkstätte, chairs by Thonet and Kohn, furniture by Danhauser, Gustav Klimt's cartoons for the Mosaic Frieze of Stoclet Palace, Du Paquier's Porcelain Cabinet chamber from Dubsky Palace, a collection of Bohemian and Venetian glass, Flemish and Italian lace, silver, porcelain and carpets as well as Chinese porcelain, Japanese colored woodcuts (Ukiyo-e) and Japanese printing stencils (Katagami).

MAK Design Lab 

On the occasion of its 150th anniversary, the MAK positioned itself more clearly than ever before as a museum for arts and the everyday world. Until 2014, the MAK Study Collection presented part of its extensive holdings in a material-specific technological order. In the course of this repositioning of the former study collection, MAK cooperated with the Austrian design team EOOS and the IDRV – Institute of Design Research Vienna in order to make cross-links between 21st century art and earlier epochs directly tangible.

Since its transformation into the MAK Design Lab, almost 2,000 exhibits – divided into themed islands – have created a newly conceived showcase in the entire basement of the museum for lifelike references between historical arts and crafts and contemporary design. Interactive thematic areas form an illustrative course on areas such as cooking (including a replica of Margarete Schütte-Lihotzky's Frankfurt kitchen), eating and drinking, sitting, artistic, industrial and alternative production, transporting, communicating and ornament, and the Helmut Lang Archive, which shows the artistic highlights with selected designs.

The newly created passageways and modular units lead to a connecting spatial experience and allow rapid adaptation to changing requirements. The MAK Forum forms a flexibly usable space, which is used as a meeting place as well as an experimental area for exhibitions and mediation formats.

In the MAK Works on Paper Room temporary exhibitions take place—mostly from the holdings of the Library and the Works on Paper Collection—with a richness of topics presenting posters, architecture projects, style imitations, and Japanese woodblock prints, for example.

The MAK Library and Works on Paper Collection conveys information about all areas of applied art. The literature encompasses the time from the 16th century up to the present with some manuscripts, incunabulas, and printed works ranging from the 15th century until today. The Works on Paper Collection comprises ornamental engravings, posters, photos, hand drawings, watercolors, and plans as well as hand drawings from the archives of the Wiener Werkstätte.

The MAK Contemporary Art Collection serves as a presentation room for contemporary projects by international artists, i. a. engaging with topics from the fin de siècle period.

Digital Museum 
The MAK has a wide range of digital offerings. Data on the collection or the in-house publications are released for research and formats such as the MAK-Digistories or the MAK-Blog provide information on a wide variety of topics. The audio guide is provided free of charge in the form of a web-based app.

MAK Collection Online 
With its MAK Collection Online the MAK makes large parts of its collection accessible to the public:

 Japanese colored woodcuts / Ukiyo-e
 East Asian Art
 Late antiquity textiles
 Posters
 Ornamental prints
 Wiener Werkstätte – Drawings
 Joseph Binder—Graphic Design
  English fabrics and wallpapers around 1900 (Arts and Crafts Movement)

With over 300.000 objects, the MAK shows the largest online collection within the Austrian Federal Museums.

Publications 
Over 50.000 pages of the MAK's journals are available online.

Google Arts & Culture 
Since May 2017, the MAK with its collection highlights can also be visited virtually on Google Arts & Culture: Gigapixel images of Gustav Klimt's design drawings for the execution of a frieze in the dining room of the Stoclet Palace in Brussels (1910–1911) can be seen as well as parts of the heroic epic Hamzanama, which is one of the major works of painting in the Islamic world.

3D-Tours 
Both the museum's main building as well as the Geymüllerschlössl can be discovered with 3D-tours. Furthermore, some exhibitions like Sheila Hicks were virtually available in 3D during the COVID-19 pandemic.

Multimedia and Games 
In addition to video and audio formats, the MAK presented its first online games, "Mix MAK" and "World Wide Wonderland".

Awards 
 1996: "Museum of the Year Award" from the Council of Europe, Strasbourg

Exhibitions 

 2010: Firing Cells. About Having A Moment – curated by Gregor Eichinger 
 2010: Otto Neurath. Gypsy Urbanism 
 2010: Josef Dabernig. Excursus on Fitness 
 2010: Artists in focus: #8 Hans Weigand. Vortex 
 2010: Fat / Sam Jacob. Duplicate Array: Buildings / Places / Objects  
 2010: Ming. Interlude 
 2010: Ina Seidl. Jewelry  
 2010: Flowers for Kim Il Sung. Art and Architecture from the Democratic People's Republic of Korea 
 2010: Minimal. Art and Furniture from the MAK Collection 
 2010: Apokalypse / Keinen Keks heute. Otto Mühl
 2010: Project Vienna. How to React to a City 
 2010: Josef Dabernig. 1 sculpture 2 versions 
 2010: Artists in focus #9 Plamen Dejanoff. Heads & Tails 
 2010: Design Criminals. Or a New Joy into the World curated by Sam Jacob 
 2010: Mihály Biró. Pathos in Red 
 2010: David Zink Yi. Manganese Make My Colors Blue 
 2010: Crossover. Two Collections – Private and Public 
 2010: Leather, Fabric and Zipper. Bags and Purses from the MAK Collection 
 2010: Contemporary. Jewelry from Austria. The "Eligius" Austrian Jewelry Design Award, 2010 
 2010: 100 Best Posters 09. Germany Austria Switzerland 
 2010: Andrea Branzi. The Weak Metropolis: for a "New Charter of Athens" 
 2010: Eva Schlegel. In Between 
 2011: Bruno. Bruno Kreisky as portrayed by Konrad Rufus Müller 
 2011: The Great Viennese Café: A Laboratory. Phase I 
 2011: APPLY! Taste Art 
 2011: Artists in focus #10 Erwin Wurm. Schöner Wohnen 
 2011: SPAN (Matias del Campo & Sandra Manninger). Formations 
 2011: Kurt Ryslavy. Collector, Wine Merchant, Sunday Painter. A Conceptual-Sculptural Intervention 
 2011: The Emperor's New Colors. 19th-Century Chinese Art from the MAK Collection 
 2011: The Second Skin. Objects for Packing and Preserving 
 2011: Industrial Furniture. Prototypes of the Modern Era 
 2011: Rudolf Steiner – Alchemy of the Everyday 
 2011: Artists in focus #11 Walter Pichler. Sculptures Models Drawings 
 2011: Michael Wallraff. looking up.vertical public space 
 2011: The Great Viennese Café: A Laboratory. Phase II & Experimental Design 
 2011: Artists' Books on Tour. Artist Competition and Mobile Museum 
 2011: Gôm Sú'. Ceramics from Viêt Nam, a 2000-Year History 
 2011: 2 x 100 Best Posters at the MAK 
 2011: Envisioning Buildings: Reflecting Architecture in Contemporary Art Photography 
 2012: Patrick Rampelotto. Adventures in Foam  
 2012: The Magic of Diversity. The MAK as Applied Space of the Future 
 2012: Gustav Klimt. Cartoons for the Mosaic Frieze at Stoclet House 
 2012: sound:frame festival 2012. Exhibition "substructions" 
 2012: ...Furniture of All Kinds. Design drawings from the Danhauser Furniture Factory 
 2012: Stiefel & Company Architects. Faux Terrains 
 2012: Made 4 You. Design for Change 
 2012: Things. plain & simple 
 2012: Kurt Spurey. Sedimente. Chawan. 4 Colors 4 Forms 
 2012: Benjamin Hirte. the classic mob ballet 
 2012: taliaYsebastian. The Committee of Sleep 
 2012: Masterpieces 
 2012: Contemporary Necklaces 
 2012: Others curated by Pae White 
 2012: Vienna 1900. Viennese Arts and Crafts, 1890–1938 
 2012: 100 Best Posters 11. Germany Austria Switzerland 
 2012: WerkStadt Vienna. Design Engaging the City 
 2012: Kathi Hofer. craftivism 
 2013: Nippon Chinbotsu. Japan Sinks. A Manga   
 2013: Signs Taken in Wonder. Searching for Contemporary Istanbul 
 2013: Marco Dessí. Still Life 
 2013: A Shot of Rhythm and Color. English Textile Design of the late 19th Century 
 2013: JEX – Jewelry Exhibition. Jewelry by Petra Zimmermann 
 2013: Loos. Our Contemporary 
 2013: Kerstin von Gabain. City of Broken Furniture 
 2013: Verena Dengler. 
 2013: Lisa Truttmann. My Stage is your Domain 
 2013: Sonic Fabric feat. BLESS N°45 Soundperfume engineered by Popkalab 
 2013: 100 Best Posters 12. Germany Austria Switzerland 
 2013: Pae White. Orllegro 
 2013: Scientific Skin feat. Bare Conductive in collaboration with Fabio Antinori + Alicja Pytlewska 
 2013: Franz von Zülow. Paper  
 2014: sound:frame 2014. If this is the Answer, what is the Question? 
 2014: soma architecture. Immanent Elasticity 
 2014: After-Images.150 Years of the MAK – Exhibitions in Pictures 
 2014: Exemplary.150 Years of the MAK – from Arts and Crafts to Design 
 2014: Hollein. 
 2014: Hanna Krüger [Die Sammlung] a collective structure 
 2014: South meets North: Local Innovation. Global Conversation 
 2014: Tomorrow is... 
 2014: Valentin Ruhry. Grand Central 
 2014: 100 Beste Posters 13. Germany Austria Switzerland. 
 2014: Schwadron Brothers: new places und traces 
 2014: I Santillana. 
 2014: photo::vienna. Retrospective 2014 
 2014: Ways to Modernism. Josef Hoffmann, Adolf Loos, and Their Impact 
 2015: Jewellery 1970–2015. Bollmann Collection. Fritz Maierhofer – Retrospective 
 2015: Eoos. Design between Archaic and High Tech 
 2015: Alfredo Barsuglia. Cabinet 
 2015: Amie Siegel. Provenance 
 2015: Future Light. Escaping Transparency 
 2015: Uneven Growth. Tactical Urbanisms for Expanding Megacities 
 2015: 2051. Smart Life in the City 
 2015: The Art of Working – Agency in Digital Modernity 
 2015: Mapping Bucharest. Art, Memory, and Revolution 1916–2016 
 2015: 24/7. the human condition 
 2015: Christoph Niemann. Drawing the Line 
 2015: photo::vienna. Retrospective 2015 
 2015: Villa Tugendhat 
 2015: Stefan Sagmeister: The Happy Show 
 2015: 100 Best Posters 14. Germany Austria Switzerland 
 2015: Josef Frank. Against Design. 
 2016: Fashion Utopias. Haute Couture in the Graphic Arts 
 2016: Kay Walkowiak. Forms in Time. 
 2016: Josiah McElehny. The Ornament Museum   
 2016: Robert La Roche. Personal View   
 2016: Friedrich Kiesler. Life Visions   
 2016: Eligius Award 2016. Jewelry in Austria   
 2016: 100 Beste Posters 15. Germany Austria Switzerland   
 2016: City Factory. Social Furniture Collection by Eoos   
 2016: photo::vienna. Retrospective 2016   
 2016: Shunga. Erotic Art from Japan   
 2016: Patrycja Domanska. Stimuli   
 2016: The Goldscheider Company. Viennese Ceramics 1885–1938   
 2016: handiCRAFT. Traditional Skills in the Digital Age    
 2017: The Glass of the Architects. Vienna 1900–1937   
 2017: Glasses from the Empire and Biedermeier Period   
 2017: Book Covers of the Wiener Werkstätte   
 2017: 650 Years of Gold- and Silversmiths. The Competitions   
 2017: Library for Social Design    
 2017: Hello, Robot. Design between Human and Machine. An exhibition of the MAK, the Vitra Design Museum, and the Design Museum Gent  
 2017: CityFactory: New Work. New Design    
 2017: What Do We Want? Dimensions of a New Digital Humanism   
 2017: LeveL. the fragile balance of utopia   
 2017: ich weiß nicht. Growing Relations between Things.   
 2017: Artificial Tears. Singularity & Humanness—A Speculation   
 2017: Design for Agency.    
 2017: photo::vienna. Retrospective 2017   
 2017: 100 Best Posters 16. Germany Austria Switzerland    
 2017: Thomas Bayrle. If It's Too Long—Make It Longer    
 2017: Aesthetics of Change:150 Years of the University of Applied Arts Vienna   
 2018: Klimt's Magic Garden. A Virtual Reality Experience by Frederick Baker   
 2018: Gustav Peichl. 15 Buildings for His 90th 
2018: 300 YEARS OF THE VIENNA PORCELAIN MANUFACTORY
2018: POST-OTTO WAGNER: From the Postal Savings Bank to Post-Modernism
2018: 100 BEST POSTERS 17. Germany Austria Switzerland
2018: SAGMEISTER & WALSH: Beauty

MAK Branches 
The MAK Branches cover several continents and countries:

 Vienna: MAK Branch Geymüllerschlössel   MAK Tower Contemporary Art Depot at the Arenbergpark (currently closed)  MAK Art in Public Space
 Czech Republic: Josef Hoffmann-Museum, Brtnice/Pirnitz (since the beginning of 2006, a joint branch of the Moravian Gallery in Brno and MAK Vienna)
 USA: MAK Center for Art and Architecture, Los Angeles (Rudolph Schindler House, Pearl M. Mackey Apartment House, Fitzpatrick-Leland House).

Nearby buildings 
 Stadtpark, Vienna
 Urania
 Café Prückel
 Wien Mitte railway station
 Austrian Postal Savings Bank
 Hotel Intercontinental Vienna
 Konzerthaus, Vienna
 Kursalon Hübner
 Stephansplatz, Vienna

References

External links 

  
 MAK Collection Online
 MAK Audio-Guide
 3D-Tour Main Building
 3D-Tours Geymüllerschlössl:
 Entrance
 Inside
 Park
 MAK Publications
 MAK Design Shop
 Wien Geschichte Wiki: MAK – Museum für angewandte Kunst (in German)
 Oesterreichisches Museum für Kunst und Industrie. In: Allgemeine Bauzeitung, 1871 (with plans) on Anno (Austrian Newspapers Online)
 
Virtual tour of the Museum of Applied Arts, Vienna provided by Google Arts & Culture

Art museums and galleries in Vienna
Decorative arts museums
Art museums established in 1864
1864 establishments in the Austrian Empire
19th-century architecture in Austria